Sigmund Ruud (30 December 1907 – 7 April 1994) was a Norwegian ski jumper. Together with his brothers Birger and Asbjørn, he dominated ski jumping in the 1920s and 1930s.

Career
At the 1928 Winter Olympics in St. Moritz, Sigmund earned a silver medal. At the 1929 FIS Nordic World Ski Championships, he won the ski jumping competition while earning a bronze at the 1930 event. Sigmund also competed in the ski jumping competition at the Holmenkollen ski festival, which first began in 1933. He also competed at the 1932 Winter Olympics in the ski jumping event, but finished seventh due to appendicitis. Additionally, Sigmund wanted to compete in the first alpine skiing events at the 1936 Winter Olympics, though he did not start.

For his contributions in ski jumping, Sigmund earned the Holmenkollen medal in 1949, the last of the three Ruud brothers to do so. Sigmund was the only one of the three not to win the Holmenkollen ski jumping competition. Sigmund Ruud and fellow Norwegian ski jumper Jacob Tullin Thams are considered co-creators of the Kongsberger technique after World War I, a ski jumping technique that was the standard until it was superseded by the Daescher technique in the 1950s. Ruud also served as chairman of the FIS Ski Jumping Committee in 1946–1955 and 1959–1967. He owned and ran a sport shop in Oslo.

On 24 February 1931 he set his first official world record at 264 ft (80.5 metres). Later he set two more official world records at 84 m (276 ft) and 86 m (282 ft).

Ruud appeared in two films: The White Stadium (1928, as himself) and The Woman in the Advocate's Gown (1929).

Ski jumping world records

 Not recognized! He stood and tied Lymburne's WR distance, but hors concours, outside of competition.
 Not recognized! Ground touch at world record distance.

References

External links

Holmenkollen medalists – click Holmenkollmedaljen for downloadable pdf file 
Swiss Olympic Committee St. Moritz 1928, 1928. (digitized version) 
Swiss Olympic Committee Résultats DES concours DES IImes jeux Olympiques d'Hiver, 1928. (digitized version) 
Organizing Committee III Olympic Winter Games Lake Placid 1932, 1932 (digitized version) 
Organizing Committee, IV. Olympische Winterspiele 1936 Amtlicher Bericht, Reichssportverlag Berlin SW 68, 1936 (digitized version) 

1907 births
1994 deaths
Norwegian male ski jumpers
Norwegian male alpine skiers
Olympic ski jumpers of Norway
Ski jumpers at the 1928 Winter Olympics
Ski jumpers at the 1932 Winter Olympics
Alpine skiers at the 1936 Winter Olympics
Olympic silver medalists for Norway
Holmenkollen medalists
Olympic medalists in ski jumping
FIS Nordic World Ski Championships medalists in ski jumping
Medalists at the 1928 Winter Olympics
Kongsberg IF ski jumpers
People from Kongsberg
Sportspeople from Viken (county)
20th-century Norwegian people